The Battle of Stanwick was a conflict that took place in AD 71, near Stanwick in northern England), between the Roman army and the Brigantes, in which the Romans defeated the Brigantes. 

Doubt has been expressed about this battle, and there is no evidence of any battle of significance having been fought at this site despite several archaeological investigations.

References
Nigel Rodgers, The Rise and fall of ancient Rome, London - 2004.
'The Stanwick fortifications',  Wheeler 1954
'Stanwick: excavation and fieldwork', Haselgrove and Turnbull 1981-3 Durham University Occ paper No 4
'Stanwick' (various papers) Arch. J. 147 (1990)
B. Dobson in 'Roman Durham', Trans. Archit. and Archaeological Soc. Durh. and Northumb. ns 2 (1970), 31 f.

71
Stanwick
Stanwick
1st century in Roman Britain
70s conflicts